TS Class 7 was a series of 28 trams and 15 trailers built by Strømmens Værksted for Trondheim Sporvei. They were delivered in 1956–57.

On 10 October 1956, almost all operative trams used by the company were lost to the flames. Subsequently, Trondheim Sporvei ordered the Class 6 from Strømmen. Five engines were salvaged from the fire, and were reused in trams 1 through 5. The remaining deliveries were numbered 10–32. The Class 6 remained in service until 1984, when the Class 8 was delivered. Until then, the Class 7 served as the only tram on the Trondheim Tramway. Four trams and one trailer have been preserved by the Trondheim Tramway Museum.

References

Trondheim Tramway stock

600 V DC multiple units
Multiple units of Norway